Acanthomyrmex dusun is a species of ant that belongs to the genus Acanthomyrmex. It was described by Wheeler in 1919, and is found in Indonesia.

References

dusun
Insects described in 1919
Insects of Indonesia